Reşadiye Mosque is a mosque in Eskişehir, Turkey.

The street to the north west of the mosque is also named Reşadiye.
The mosque was built in 1916 by Ottoman Sultan Mehmet V (reigned 1909–1918), who was also known as Reşat. In 1979, it was rebuilt keeping the former name. Although its architect was Cevat Ulger, it was completed after the death of its architect.
The mosque with two minarets was designed after the style of the historical New Mosque in Eminönü, İstanbul

References

Buildings and structures in Eskişehir Province
Odunpazarı
Mosques completed in 1979
Ottoman architecture in Turkey
Mosques in Eskişehir
20th-century religious buildings and structures in Turkey